The Freightliner Inspiration is a prototype semi-trailer truck designed by Freightliner Trucks.  The truck is the first autonomous commercial vehicle to be legally operated in the United States.  There have been two units produced.

The truck was licensed to operate by the Nevada Department of Motor Vehicles in 2015.

References

External links
Official Freightliner Inspiration page

Freightliner Inspiration
Emerging technologies
Inspiration
Tractor units